Boode is a small hamlet in North Devon, England. A large dairy farm is situated there. The farm won the Farmers Weekly 'Dairy Farmer of the Year' award 2011.

External links

Hamlets in Devon
Braunton